A Bashful Bigamist is a 1921 short silent film that was unknown and thought to be a lost film, but a copy was found in the New Zealand Film Archive in 2009. The film is currently viewable on the National Film Preservation Foundation website without a musical score.

Sources
 New Zealand Academy of Motion Picture Arts
  National Film Preservation Foundation

1921 films
American silent short films
American black-and-white films
1920s rediscovered films
1921 comedy films
Silent American comedy films
Rediscovered American films
1920s American films